A skwal is the main piece of equipment used for skwalling, a hybrid sport combining the carving of skiing and riding feel of snowboarding. It is similar to a snowboard or monoski in that both feet are attached to the same board. On a skwal the feet are one in front of the other, in line with the direction the skwal is pointing in. This differs from snowboards (in which the feet are side-on to the direction of the board) and monoskis (in which the feet point in the direction of the board, but are side-by-side).

History 
The skwal was invented by two French ski-school instructors Patrick "Thias" Balmain and Manuel Jammes, with the first prototype appearing in 1992. They envisaged it as a way to offer different sensations to what skiing and snowboarding could offer, at a time when 'carving' skis were only just starting to take off.  A French company called Lacroix took an interest, recruited Patrick Balmain, and started producing skwals. A few years later, Patrick left Lacroix and started his own skwal-making company. There are now several other makers of skwals, though the sport has never gained the widespread popularity its creators predicted - possibly due to the perceived difficulty of the sport.

Bindings 
Skwal bindings are specific. They resemble those alpine snowboarding, but are usually thinner to fit the board which is very thin. The rear binding has a heel that creates a natural inclination for the rear foot. The front binding has a canting making an opposite inclination for the front foot.

Boots 
Alpine snowboarding hard boots are typically used for skwal. Feet must be held firmly but ankles need the flexibility to bend front and back. For comfort, the rear foot should be less tight than the front foot.

See also 

Sport
Grass skiing
Water skiing
Winter sport
Snowshoe
Skiing
Alpine skiing
Freestyle skiing
Mogul skiing
Monoski
Skiboarding
Snowkiting
Teleboard

External links
Ace Skwal
Skwalzone
Skwalattack
Monoski-Skwal

Snow sports